Scott Thompson Baker (born September 15, 1960) is an American television actor, from Golden Valley, Minnesota. Some of his most notable roles are Colton Shore on General Hospital, Craig Lawson on All My Children, and Connor Davis on The Bold and the Beautiful.

Life and career
Baker was born in Golden Valley, Minnesota. He was educated at Oral Roberts University and the University of Minnesota. He was married to Leilani Baker on January 27, 1990; their marriage produced two children, Thane and Jaden. After he and Leilani divorced, he was married to Maria Baker on June 17, 2007.

Baker's professional acting career began at the Guthrie Theatre in Minneapolis, where he starred in roles such as A Christmas Carol, Peer Gynt, Hamlet and The Sound of Music. In the 1980s, after winning Star Search in 1985, Baker took up the role of Colton Shore, on the soap opera General Hospital, which he held for three years. For a year, he played Craig Lawson on All My Children, and then for seven years played Connor Davis on The Bold and the Beautiful. He also starred in the Star Trek: Deep Space Nine episode "One Little Ship" as Kudak'Etan.

In 1989, Scott Thompson Baker won the Soap Opera Digest Award for Outstanding Male Newcomer, for his role as Colton in General Hospital. He also received two nominations in 1990, for Outstanding Super Couple: Daytime (shared with Kristina Wagner) and Outstanding Hero: Daytime, for the same role. However, he lost to Doug Davidson, as Paul in The Young and the Restless, and A Martinez and Marcy Walker, for Cruz and Eden in Santa Barbara.

References

External links

1960 births
Living people
People from Golden Valley, Minnesota
Oral Roberts University alumni
University of Minnesota alumni
20th-century American male actors